De Fato (English: "Concerning Fate") is a partially lost philosophical treatise written by the Roman orator Cicero in 44 BC. Only two-thirds of the work exists; the beginning and ending are missing. It takes the form of a dialogue, although it reads more like an exposition,  whose interlocutors are Cicero and his friend Aulus Hirtius.

In the work, Cicero analyzes the concept of Fate, and suggests that free will is a condition of Fate. Cicero, however, does not consciously deal with the distinction between fatalism and determinism.

It appears that De Fato is an appendix to the treatise on theology formed by the three books of De Natura Deorum and the two books of De Divinatione. These three books provide important information regarding Stoic cosmology and theology.

History
De fato is part of the second group of Cicero's writings. The work was composed at Pozzuoli between April 17 and May 23 of 44 BC. In any case, the work would have most likely been completed prior to Cicero's abortive departure for Greece in July of that year. The work was written in haste, as Cicero was planning to return to the political arena.

Argumentation
Hirtius notes that Cicero has adopted the Academic method of investigation: arguing against all propositions. Therefore, he outlines the positions of Democritus, Heraclitus, Empedocles, and Aristotle as those who maintained that everything happens by necessity. As such Cicero develops the propositions of fate and necessity as follows:

Cicero essentially dismisses this proposition as antithetical to what is observed, but postulates freedom as a necessity for moral life. Ultimately, Cicero maintains this position as he is emotionally convinced that it is in man's power to achieve virtue for himself; if determinism were the order of things, then such ability would not be true.

See also
De Natura Deorum
De Divinatione
Compatibilism
Incompatibilism
Destiny
Alexander of Aphrodisias, who also wrote a treatise titled On Fate

References

External links
De Fato, Latin text, at The Latin Library
H. Rackham, (1948) Cicero: De Oratore, Vol. ii. Loeb Classical Library [De Fato, pp. 189–251].

Philosophical works by Cicero
Philosophy of religion
Ancient Roman religion